The Source was a radio network operated in the 1970s and 1980s by the NBC Radio Network, with newscasts and features focusing on 18- to 34-year-olds. The network was sold, along with the rest of NBC's radio operations, to Westwood One in August 1987. The Source would last until the late 1990s as a programming source before ultimately being absorbed into Westwood One.

Announcements from the network, voiced by legendary NBC announcer Don Pardo, continued to be heard on many radio stations across the country until Pardo's death in 2014.

Defunct radio networks in the United States
NBC Radio Network
American companies disestablished in 1988
Radio stations disestablished in 1988